Pseudascalenia is a genus of moth in the family Cosmopterigidae.

Species
Pseudascalenia abbasella Kasy, 1975
Pseudascalenia riadella Kasy, 1968

References
Natural History Museum Lepidoptera genus database

Cosmopterigidae